Frank Hansen (born 23 February 1983) is a retired Danish football defender.

On 9 May 2006 he was selected for the Danish squad for UEFA U-21 Championship 2006.

Hansen was signed on a free transfer by Silkeborg IF in the summer of 2009.

References

External links
National team profile
Career statistics at Danmarks Radio

1983 births
Living people
Danish men's footballers
Denmark under-21 international footballers
Denmark youth international footballers
Ølstykke FC players
Esbjerg fB players
Silkeborg IF players
Danish Superliga players
Danish 1st Division players
Association football defenders
People from Roskilde Municipality
Sportspeople from Region Zealand